The 2014–15 WCHA women's ice hockey season marked the continuation of the annual tradition of competitive ice hockey among Western Collegiate Hockey Association members.

Regular season

News and notes

October
October 3: In her NCAA debut, Emily Clark registered three points (two goals, one assist) in a 4-1 victory against the Minnesota-Duluth Bulldogs.

November
November 1:  Bemidji State defeated the top-ranked Minnesota Golden Gophers by a 1-0 tally, handing them their first loss of the season. The game-winning goal was scored by Ivana Bilic. 
November 24: The Minnesota Golden Gophers and St. Cloud State Huskies faced off in the U.S. Hockey Hall of Fame Women's Face-Off Classic. Golden Gophers freshman Kelly Pannek registered her first NCAA career hat trick as Minnesota prevailed by a 5-0 tally. Goaltender Amanda Leveille earned the shutout in a 19-save effort.

Postseason
March 7: The Bemidji State Beavers defeated the Minnesota Golden Gophers by a 1-0 tally in the semifinals of the WCHA Final Face-Off. The game-winning goal was scored by Stephanie Anderson in the third period. Beavers goaltender Brittni Mowat made 37 saves, registering her seventh shutout of the season, a new program record. In addition, it marked the first time that the Beavers advanced to the championship game of the WCHA Final Face-Off.

In-season honors

Players of the week

Defensive players of the week

Rookies of the week

Awards and honors
WCHA Player of the Year: Hannah Brandt, Minnesota
WCHA Rookie of the Year: Annie Pankowski, Wisconsin
WCHA Coach of the Year: Jim Scanlan, Bemidji State
WCHA Defensive Player of the Year: Rachel Ramsey, Minnesota
WCHA Outstanding Student-Athlete of the Year: Shelby Amsley-Benzie, North Dakota
WCHA Scoring Champion - Hannah Brandt, Minnesota
WCHA Goaltending Champion - Shelby Amsley-Benzie, North Dakota

ALL-WCHA First Team

ALL-WCHA Second Team

ALL-WCHA Third Team

WCHA All-Rookie Team

References

See also
 National Collegiate Women's Ice Hockey Championship

 
Western Collegiate Hockey Association